Tanya Grae (born 1970) is an American poet and essayist, whose debut collection Undoll was awarded the Julie Suk Award and a Florida Book Award and was a National Poetry Series finalist. Her poems and essays have been widely published in literary journals, including Ploughshares, American Poetry Review, AGNI, Prairie Schooner, Post Road, and The Massachusetts Review. Grae was born in Sumter, South Carolina, while her father was stationed at Shaw AFB. She grew up traveling the United States as her father relocated for the military every few years and often writes about those early experiences. Her family is from Nashville, Tennessee and is of Irish, Dutch, and Cherokee descent. Her primary themes often revolve around the natural world, the American Southeast, womanhood, girlhood, matrilineal history, domesticity, and feminism.

Grae attended Rollins College and then earned her MFA at Bennington College. While completing her PhD at Florida State University, she received several awards including the Edward H. and Marie C. Kingsbury Fellowship and the 2018 John McKay Shaw Academy of American Poets Prize.

She lives in Tallahassee, Florida.

Bibliography

Books 
 

In Anthology

Selected poems 
 "Oblation", Poetry Daily, 2020, republication
 "As Faithful as His Options", Missouri Review, 2019
 "In Elixir" and "Rewind", Post Road, 2017
 "Lethe", AGNI, July 2016, AAP Award 2018
 "Mating Season", AGNI, July 2016
 "Undolled", The Adroit Journal, Winter 2016

Awards and honors 
 2019 Julie Suk Award, Best Poetry Book Published by a Literary Press (for Undoll)
 2019 Florida Book Award (for Undoll)
 2018 John McKay Shaw Academy of American Poets Prize 
 2017 National Poetry Series Finalist
 2016 Tennessee Williams/New Orleans Literary Festival Poetry Prize
 2010 Arden Goettling Academy of American Poets Prize

References

External links 
 Personal Website
 NPR/WFSU

Living people
Poets from Florida
Poets from Tennessee
21st-century American poets
American feminist writers
American women poets
Southern United States literature
1970 births
People from Sumter, South Carolina
American essayists
Rollins College alumni
Poets from South Carolina
Bennington College alumni
Florida State University faculty
American women academics
21st-century American women writers